Inicijativa TV is Bosnian online television channel based in city of Tuzla. It was established in 2012 by
Centers of Civic initiatives. The programming is produced in the Croatian, Serbian and Bosnian language.

References

External links 
 www.inicijativa.tv
 www.cci.ba
 Communications Regulatory Agency of Bosnia and Herzegovina

Mass media in Tuzla
Television channels and stations established in 2012
Television stations in Bosnia and Herzegovina